John Carson  (born 31 July 1933) is a former Northern Ireland Ulster Unionist Party politician.

Career 
A draper who owned a shop in the interface area of the Duncairn Gardens in north Belfast, Carson was elected to Belfast City Council in 1973. At the February 1974 general election, he was elected as a member of the United Ulster Unionist Coalition as the Member of Parliament for Belfast North. At the October 1974 general election, Carson was re-elected with a substantial increase in his majority.

However, he was de-selected in 1979, after voting in favour of the Labour government in the crucial vote of confidence, which they lost. In that year's general election, Belfast North was gained by Johnny McQuade of the Democratic Unionist Party, with Cecil Walker coming second for the UUP.

Despite this, Carson retained his popularity, topping the local government poll in the electoral area 'H', which included over half of the parliamentary seat. He also topped the poll in North Belfast at the 1982 Assembly elections.

Carson was Lord Mayor of Belfast from 1985 to 1986, and in his capacity as a councillor, was sometimes at odds with his party colleagues. For example, he attended a City Hall lunch attended by the then Secretary of State Tom King, despite the Unionist policy of boycotting meetings with Government ministers in protest at the Anglo-Irish Agreement. For this, he was threatened with expulsion from the UUP, which never happened.

He remained a member of Belfast City Council until 1997, when he lost his seat after 24 consecutive years on the council.

Personal life 
He married Martha in 1953 and had two daughters. They celebrated their Diamond Anniversary in 2013.

References

Sources
The Times Guide to the House of Commons, Times Newspapers Ltd, October 1974

External links 
 

1933 births
Commanders of the Order of the British Empire
High Sheriffs of Belfast
Living people
Lord Mayors of Belfast
Ulster Unionist Party members of the House of Commons of the United Kingdom
Members of Belfast City Council
Members of the Parliament of the United Kingdom for Belfast constituencies (since 1922)
Northern Ireland MPAs 1982–1986
UK MPs 1974
UK MPs 1974–1979